The Schedules of the Niue Constitution Act 1974 form the Niue constitution. It stipulates the make-up of the executive branch of the government, the legislative branch, and the judicial branch. The Niue Constitution Act 1974 is the supreme law of Niue; any other Niue law that is inconsistent with the Niue Constitution Act 1974 will be deemed to be invalid.

Its granting by the New Zealand Parliament in 1974 is celebrated yearly as Niue's independence on "Constitution Day" on 19 October. The road towards self-government for Niue started with the UN Decolonisation Committee putting pressure on New Zealand for Niue to decide what form of status Niue wanted. The people of Niue voted in 1974 choosing the self-government option as the best direction for Niue. The Niue Constitution is the legal doctrine that put the wishes of the Niue people for self-government into practice. Self-government allows for Niueans to lead and take charge of their own affairs; this has reduced the number of New Zealand expats working in key Government positions from around 20 in 1974 to none at the moment.

The Niue Constitution requires 2/3 majority in the three readings in the Legislative Assembly and also requires 2/3 support from the electors before it can be amended. There is a select committee that have been working on reviewing the constitution but have made little progress, which is normal when dealing with a complex document like this.

References

External links
 Niue Constitution Act 1974, at New Zealand Legislation
 Niue Constitution Act 1974, at Pacific Islands Legal Information Institute

History of Niue
Government of Niue
Constitutions of country subdivisions
Law of Niue
Statutes of New Zealand
1974 in law
1974 in New Zealand law
1974 in Niue
1974 in international relations